Wellsville Erie Depot is a historic train station located at Wellsville in Allegany County, New York. It was constructed in 1911, for the Erie Railroad. It is a one-story,  by  structure displaying elements of the Queen Anne and Romanesque Revival styles popular in the late 19th and early 20th century.  It is located across the street from the Wellsville Post Office.

Being on the Erie mainline, into the 1960s, the Erie Limited and the Atlantic Express/Pacific Express passenger trains made stops there. The last train making stops there was the Erie Lackawanna's Lake Cities which was discontinued on January 6, 1970.

It was listed on the National Register of Historic Places in 1987.

See also
List of Erie Railroad structures documented by the Historic American Engineering Record

References

External links

Railway stations on the National Register of Historic Places in New York (state)
Queen Anne architecture in New York (state)
Railway stations in the United States opened in 1851
Former Erie Railroad stations
Former railway stations in New York (state)
Buildings and structures in Allegany County, New York
Historic American Engineering Record in New York (state)
National Register of Historic Places in Allegany County, New York
1851 establishments in New York (state)